Fury is an American hardcore punk band from Southern California.

History
Fury first released their six-song demo through Mosher's Delight Records in March 2014. This was quickly followed up by the release of their debut EP, Kingdom Come, later in 2014 on Triple-B Records. 

As 2015 closes, Fury released a promo for their upcoming 2016 full-length. In 2016, Fury released their debut full-length record titled Paramount on Triple-B Records. With the positive feedback from the band's previous releases which combines elements of youth crew and other several hardcore subgenres, Fury released a promo for their 2019 LP. 

On May 3, 2019, Fury, signed to Run for Cover Records, released their second full-length album titled Failed Entertainment.

Members

Current 

 Alfredo Gutierrez - rhythm guitar (2014-present)
 Alex Samayoa - drums (2014-present)
 Danny Samayoa - bass (2014-present)
 Jeremy Stith - vocals (2014-present)
 Madison Woodward - lead guitar (2014-present)

References

American musical groups